Henry Seabright was a magazine and children's book illustrator who contributed to The Strand and the Reader's Digest Condensed Books series. Seabright also contributed to Bible Story and the comic Playhour where he drew a comic strip adaptation of E. Nesbit's novel Five Children and It.

External links
 Look and Learn website search for Henry Seabright

British comics artists
Possibly living people
Year of birth missing (living people)